Siderus is a Neotropical genus of butterflies in the family Lycaenidae.

Species
Siderus leucophaeus (Hübner, 1818)
Siderus parvinotus Kaye, 1904
Siderus guapila (Schaus, 1913)
Siderus eliatha (Hewitson, 1867)
Siderus bouvieri (Lathy, 1936)
Siderus athymbra (Hewitson, 1867)
Siderus philinna (Hewitson, 1868)
Siderus giapor (Schaus, 1902)

References

Eumaeini
Lycaenidae of South America
Lycaenidae genera